Xylocopa tabaniformis, the horsefly-like carpenter bee or mountain carpenter bee is a species of carpenter bee in the family Apidae. It is found in Central America, North America, and South America. Males have yellow hair on the thorax.

Subspecies
These 10 subspecies belong to the species Xylocopa tabaniformis:
 Xylocopa tabaniformis androleuca Michener, 1940
 Xylocopa tabaniformis azteca Cresson, 1878
 Xylocopa tabaniformis illota Cockerell, 1919
 Xylocopa tabaniformis melanosoma O'Brien & Hurd, 1963
 Xylocopa tabaniformis melanura Cockerell, 1918
 Xylocopa tabaniformis orpifex Smith, 1874
 Xylocopa tabaniformis pallidiventris O'Brien & Hurd, 1965
 Xylocopa tabaniformis parkinsoniae Cockerell, 1917
 Xylocopa tabaniformis sylvicola O'Brien & Hurd, 1965
 Xylocopa tabaniformis tabaniformis Smith, 1854

References

Further reading

External links

 

tabaniformis
Articles created by Qbugbot
Insects described in 1854